Hello, Avalanche is the third studio album of American indietronica band The Octopus Project, released on October 9, 2007, on Peek-A-Boo Records.

Track listing

References

2007 albums
The Octopus Project albums
Peek-A-Boo Records albums